Unibol Pernambuco Futebol Clube, commonly known as Unibol, is a Brazilian football club based in Paulista, Pernambuco state.

History
The club was founded on September 12, 1996. They won the Campeonato Pernambucano Second Level in 1998, finishing ahead of Surubim.

Achievements

 Campeonato Pernambucano Second Level:
 Winners (1): 1998

Stadium
Unibol Pernambuco Futebol Clube play their home games at Estádio Ademir Cunha. The stadium has a maximum capacity of 7,000 people.

References

Football clubs in Pernambuco
Association football clubs established in 1996
1996 establishments in Brazil